Euglossa bidentata is a Euglossine bee species found in the Amazon rainforest.

References

bidentata
Hymenoptera of South America
Hymenoptera of Brazil
Fauna of the Amazon
Insects described in 1982
Orchid pollinators